Fenolleda is one of eleven parishes (administrative divisions)  in Candamo, a municipality within the province and autonomous community of Asturias, in northern Spain.

Villages
 Beifar 
 Fenolleda 
 Santa Eulalia 
 Espinosa 
 Fontebona 
 Ricabo 
 Santoseso 
 Valdemora

References

Parishes in Candamo